Vaithilingam is a family name. People with this name include:

Daisy Vaithilingam (1925-2014), Singaporean social worker
M. A. Vaithyalingam, Indian politician
R. Vaithilingam, Indian politician
V. Vaithilingam, Indian politician
 Vaithilingam Sornalingam (1949-2001), better known as Shankar (Tamil militant)